The 1923 Connecticut Aggies football team represented Connecticut Agricultural College, now the University of Connecticut, in the 1923 college football season.  The Aggies were led by first year head coach Sumner Dole, and completed the season with a record of 3–4–1. The Aggies completed their first year in the newly established New England Conference.

Schedule

References

Connecticut
UConn Huskies football seasons
Connecticut Aggies football